Dixville is a township in Coös County, New Hampshire, United States. The population was 4 as of the 2020 census, down from 12 at the 2010 census. In New Hampshire, locations, grants, townships (which are different from towns), and purchases are unincorporated portions of a county which are not part of any town and have limited self-government (if any, as many are uninhabited).

Dixville is the location of Dixville Notch State Park and The Balsams Grand Resort Hotel. It is part of the Berlin, NH–VT micropolitan statistical area. The village of Dixville Notch, consisting of development around the hotel, lies within Dixville.

Dixville will fall within the path of totality during the solar eclipse of April 8, 2024.

History

It was organized for voting purposes in 1960, and the village of Dixville Notch is commonly known as the first place to cast votes in U.S. elections. The original grant included an eastern portion (north of Wentworth Location) now known separately as Dix's Grant.

Geography
Dixville Notch is in the southwest part of the township. The notch lies within Dixville Notch State Park. (The term "notch" is the local equivalent of "pass" or "gap", and refers to a low place between mountains or mountain ranges.)

New Hampshire Route 26 crosses the township, passing through Dixville Notch. The highway leads west to Colebrook on the Connecticut River and southeast to Errol on the Androscoggin.

Demographics

As of the 2000 census, there were 75 people, 10 households, and 10 families residing in the township. The population density was 1.5 people per square mile (0.6/km2). There were 36 housing units at an average density of 0.7 per square mile (0.3/km2). The racial makeup of the township was 98.67% White, with there being only one person of any other race, a Hispanic.

There were 10 households, all composed of married couples living together, and 40.0% of which had children under the age of 18 living with them. No households were made up of individuals. The average household and family size was 2.80.

In the township the population was spread out, with 9.3% under the age of 18, 1.3% from 18 to 24, 16.0% from 25 to 44, 8.0% from 45 to 64, and 65.3% who were 65 years of age or older. The median age was 76 years. For every 100 females, there were 74.4 males. For every 100 females age 18 and over, there were 61.9 males.

References

See also
New Hampshire primary

Townships in Coös County, New Hampshire
Berlin, New Hampshire micropolitan area
Townships in New Hampshire